An agency of British India was an internally autonomous or semi-autonomous subdivision of India whose external affairs were governed by an agent designated by the Viceroy of India.

Description 

The agencies varied in character from fully autonomous self-governing dependencies such as princely states, where the agent functioned mainly as a representative of the Viceroy, to tribal tracts which were integral parts of the British Empire and where the agent was completely in charge of law and order. The agent of a protected tract or princely state usually lived outside the territory in his charge, as opposed to a Resident who usually lived within his confines and was frequently the District Collector of the adjoining British district.

Civil and criminal justice in agencies were usually administered through locally made laws, and the Indian Penal Code was not applicable by default in these agencies.

List of agencies in 1947

Former Agencies before 1947

Aden Agency (1839 – 1859)
Bagelkhand Agency March 1871 / 1933
Banas Kantha Agency
Baroda Agency
Baroda and Gujarat Agency
Bengal States Agency
Bhopal Agency 1818 / 1947-08-15
Bhopawar Agency 1882 / 1925 (merged with Malwa to form Malwa and Bhopawar Agency)
Bundelkhand Agency 1811
Chhattisgarh Agency
Cutch Agency
Ganjam Hill Tracts Agency (Madras Presidency)
Haraoti Agency
Kaira Agency
Kathiawar Agency (Bombay Presidency)
Kolaba Agency
Kolhapur Agency
Mahi Kantha Agency (Bombay Presidency)
Malwa and Bhopawar Agency 1925 / 1927 rename to Malwa and Southern States Agency
Malwa and Southern States Agency 1927 renamed from Malwa and Bhopawar Agency / 1934 renamed to Malwa
Nasik Agency
Orissa Agency 1905
Palanpur Agency 1819 (belong to Bombay Presidency, merged 10 October 1924 in WISA)
Rewa Kantha Agency (Bombay Presidency)
Sabar Kantha Agency
Surat Agency
Thana Agency
Vizagapatam Hill Tracts Agency (Madras Presidency)
Western India States Agency (WISA)

See also
Indian Political Service (IPS)
Subdivisions of British India

References

Sources and external links
 IPS Index, First Edition – Princely States Report

 
Subdivisions of British India